Lerew is a surname. Notable people with the surname include:

 Anthony Lerew (born 1982), American baseball player
 John Lerew (1912–1996), Royal Australian Air Force officer

See also
 Laroo (disambiguation)
 LeDrew
 Leroux (surname)